
Gmina Brzeziny is a rural gmina (administrative district) in Brzeziny County, Łódź Voivodeship, in central Poland. Its seat is the town of Brzeziny, although the town is not part of the territory of the gmina.

The gmina contains part of the protected area called Łódź Hills Landscape Park.

Villages
Gmina Brzeziny contains the villages and settlements of Adamów, Bielanki, Bogdanka, Bronowice, Buczek, Dąbrówka Duża, Dąbrówka Mała, Eufeminów, Gaj, Gałkówek-Kolonia, Grzmiąca, Helenów, Helenówka, Henryków, Ignaców, Jabłonów, Janinów, Jaroszki, Jordanów, Kędziorki, Małczew, Marianów Kołacki, Michałów, Paprotnia, Pieńki Henrykowskie, Poćwiardówka, Polik, Przanówka, Przecław, Rochna, Rozworzyn, Sadowa, Ściborów, Stare Koluszki, Strzemboszowice, Syberia, Szymaniszki, Tadzin, Teodorów, Tworzyjanki, Witkowice, Żabiniec and Zalesie.

Neighbouring gminas
Gmina Brzeziny is bordered by the town of Brzeziny and by the gminas of Andrespol, Dmosin, Godziesze Wielkie, Koluszki, Nowosolna, Rogów, and Stryków.

References
Polish official population figures 2006

Brzeziny
Brzeziny County